Llanthony is a village in the community of Crucorney on the northern edge of Monmouthshire, South East Wales, United Kingdom.

Location 

Llanthony is located in the Vale of Ewyas, a deep and long valley with glacial origins within the Black Mountains, Wales, seven miles north of Abergavenny and within the eastern section of the Brecon Beacons National Park. The village is on an unclassified road leading northwards from Llanvihangel Crucorney to Hay-on-Wye.

History and amenities 
Llanthony Priory is situated here. This dates back to about 1100 when a Norman nobleman Walter de Lacy was inspired by an existing chapel to devote himself to solitary prayer and study. He was joined by others and a church was built on the site in 1108. By 1118, a group of about forty monks from England built the priory of Canons Regular, the first in Wales. It was constantly being raided by the Welsh and was soon in decline, and after Owain Glyndŵr's rebellion in the early 15th century, it seems to have become barely functioning. In 1481 it was formally merged with its daughter monastery at Gloucester then was later suppressed by Henry VIII's Dissolution of the Monasteries.

The Priory became one of the great medieval buildings in Wales, being built in a mixture of Norman and Gothic architectural styles. It is a Grade I Listed building, being "an important medieval monastic ruin with high quality surviving detail."

The area is popular for hillwalking, pony trekking, Horseback riding and mountain biking. The Offa's Dyke Path passes above on the ridge which forms the border between England and Wales.

Notable residents 
The painter and illustrator Reginald "Reg" Gammon (1894–1997) was a hill farmer here for twenty years.

References

External links
Llanthony Priory in the Vale of Ewyas: the landscape impact of a medieval Priory in the Welsh Marches

Villages in Monmouthshire
Black Mountains, Wales